Ranunculus pusillus, commonly called low spearwort, is a species of flowering plant in the buttercup family (Ranunculaceae). It is native to much of the eastern United States from New York to Florida and west to Texas; it is also known in California. It grows in wet habitat, where it is semi-aquatic growing partially submerged or terrestrially on muddy substrates. 

It is a perennial herb producing a slender decumbent to erect stem up to half a meter in length. It is generally hairless in texture. Leaves have blades which are lance-shaped to oval and borne on short petioles. The flower has one to three tiny yellow petals no more than 2 millimeters long around a central receptacle with many stamens and pistils. Flowers are produced in the spring. The fruit is an achene borne in a spherical cluster of 18 or more.

References

External links
Jepson Manual Treatment
Photo gallery

pusillus
Flora of North America